This is a list of companies in London, England. London is the capital city of England and the United Kingdom. With an estimated 8,308,369 residents in 2012, London is the most populous region, urban zone and metropolitan area in the United Kingdom. The city generates approximately 20 per cent of the UK's GDP; while the economy of the London metropolitan area—the largest in Europe—generates approximately 30 per cent of the UK's GDP.

London is one of the pre-eminent financial centres of the world and vies with New York City as the most important location for international finance. Over half of the UK's top 100 listed companies (the FTSE 100) and over 100 of Europe's 500 largest companies have their headquarters in central London. Over 70 per cent of the FTSE 100 are located within London's metropolitan area, and 75 per cent of Fortune 500 companies have offices in London. London is home to 10 Global Fortune 500-ranked corporations

Companies based in London

0–9

 1E

A
 A & C Black
 Abbey (coachbuilder)
 ABK Architects
 Above the Title Productions
 Accident Advice Helpline
 Acrylicize
 Action group (sociology)
 Adastra Minerals
 Addison Lee
 Adfonic
 Agricultural & General Engineers
 Ainsworths
 Alferon Management
 Alfred McAlpine
 All3Media
 Andrew Melrose
 Angel Trains
 Anglo American
 Anglo Pacific Group
 Antony Gibbs & Sons
 AnyJunk
 Aon
 ApplianSys
 Arcadia Group
 ArenaPAL
 Aricom
 Armajaro
 Art Loss Register
 Artech House
 Artists' Collecting Society
 Arup
 Ascential
 Ashmore Group
 Ashtead Group
 Atelier One
 Atlantic Books
 Atomic Antelope
 Aviva
 Avocet Mining
 Avolites
 Argos

B

 Bad Press
 Bakkavör
 Balderton Capital
 Balfour Beatty
 Balkan Dream Properties
 Barclays
 BBA Aviation
 BBC
 BBC Records
 The Bedford Estate
 Bedlam Productions
 Bejam
 Belen Echandia
 Bell Pottinger
 Belle & Bunty
 Bentley & Skinner
 Berendsen
 Berry Brothers & Rudd
 Berwin Leighton Paisner
 Bestinvest
 Bestway
 Beta 2 Limited
 Beyond Retro
 BioMed Central
 Black Swan Data
 Bleep
 Blue
 Blue Rubicon
 Blue Whale Systems
 Bluebay Asset Management
 BMCE Bank International
 BMJ Group
 Boden
 Bodyamr
 BoldMove
 Boosey & Hawkes
 Bow & Arrow
 BP
 The Brand Union
 Brewin Dolphin
 Bridgeman Art Library
 Bridgepoint Capital
 BrightTALK
 Briglin Pottery
 Brit
 British Airways
 British American Tobacco
 British & Commonwealth Holdings
 British Energy
 British Home Stores
 British Land
 British Youth Council
 Brixton
 Broadbean
 Brogan Group
 Bromcom
 Brompton Bicycle
 BSkyB
 BT Group
 BTG
 BTR
 Bulgarian Dreams
 Bunzl
 Bupa
 Burton

C

 Cad & the Dandy
 Cadbury
 Cake Entertainment
 Cape
 Capita Group
 Capita Symonds
 Capital Economics
 Carlisle Managed Solutions
 Carlton Carriage Co
 Carter Jonas
 Cartoon Network Development Studio Europe
 Cassell
 Centaur Media
 CeX
 Chamberlin, Powell and Bon
 ChangeGroup
 Channel Four Television Corporation
 Charter International
 Cheapflights
 Chesham Amalgamations
 Cheyne Capital Management
 The Children's Investment Fund Management
 Chloride Group
 Churchill Insurance
 Cinven
 Clément-Talbot
 CLS Holdings
 CMG
 Coats
 The Cobra Group
 Coin Street Community Builders
 CompAir
 ComRes
 Coolroom
 Cosmos Holidays
 Cox & King
 Cox & Kings
 Creek Audio
 CronLab
 Current Publishing

D

 DAC Beachcroft
 Dade2
 Daejan Holdings
 Dahabshiil
 Daily Mail & General Trust
 Dalgety
 Damnably
 Darty
 DataCash
 Datacopia
 Datamonitor
 DataWind
 Davenport Lyons
 Davis Langdon
 De Vere Group
 Dealogic
 Deliveroo
 Deloitte
 Derwent Capital Markets
 Dexion
 Diageo
 Diploma
 Direct Ferries
 Diversified Global Graphics Group
 DJhistory.com
 DNEG
 Dods Group
 Dopplr
 Dorling Kindersley
 Dot2Dot
 Dr Scholl's
 Dunnhumby

E

 E-Clear
 Eastern Electricity
 Eat
 Ebiquity
 ECA International
 Ecoigo
 Ecourier
 Ede & Ravenscroft
 EDF Energy
 EE
 Electronic Music Studios
 Elementis
 Emerald Energy
 EMI
 EMI Music Publishing
 Empresaria Group
 The Energy Group
 English Eccentrics
 Enodis
 Enso Group
 Entertainment Rights
 eOffice
 Eon Digital Entertainment
 Erased Tapes Records
 Ergo ID
 Ernst & Young
 Eterniti Motors
 ETF Securities
 ETX Capital
 Eurotherm
 Evolution Group
 Evraz
 Exco International
 Expedition Engineering

F
 Family Law in Partnership
 Farmdrop
 FDM Group
 Fever Media
 FilmFair
 FilmOn
 First Intuition
 First Solution Money Transfer
 First Student UK
 Firstsource
 Floris of London
 Foster + Partners
 Forte Group
 Framestore
 Frances Lincoln Publishers
 Freddie Grubb
 Freeplay Energy
 Fremantle
 Freestone and Webb
 Fresnillo
 Future Shorts

G

 Galliford Try
 Gapforce
 Gas Light & Coke Company
 GCM Resources
 Gem Diamonds
 General Eyewear
 Generation Investment Management
 George Bell & Sons
 George Wimpey
 Gestetner
 GFMS
 Glaxo Wellcome
 GlaxoSmithKline
 GMW Architects
 The Goldsmiths' Company Assay Office
 Good Relations
 Graff Diamonds
 Greenwich Leisure Limited
 Grosvenor Group
 Gunter's Tea Shop

H

 H.R. Owen
 Hall & Partners
 Hammerson
 Hammonds
 Hand in Hand Fire & Life Insurance Society
 Hanson
 Hardy Amies
 Hardy Oil and Gas
 Hart, Son, Peard and Co.
 Hassle
 Havas Digital
 Hays
 Heathrow Airport Holdings
 Helpling
 Henderson Group
 Henry Poole & Co
 Heron International
 Hetchins
 HHCL
 Hi-Gen Power
 Higgs & Hill
 Hikma Pharmaceuticals
 Hinduja Group
 Hirst Research Centre
 HMV
 Hodge Jones & Allen
 Hogan Lovells
 Holdsworth
 Holland, Hannen & Cubitts
 Holloway Brothers
 Hooper's Telegraph Works
 Horniman's Tea
 Houlihan Lokey
 House of Fraser
 Howden Joinery
 HSBC
 Hungryhouse
 Hunting
 Huntsworth
 Hyperoptic

I

 ICM Research
 IG Group
 Imagini
 Imperial Continental Gas Association
 Imperial Innovations
 Ince Gordon Dadds
 Inchcape
 Information Security Forum
 Inmarsat
 Intermediate Capital Group
 International Computers Limited
 International Power
 International Tea Co. Stores
 Intertek
 Invensys
 Iona Capital
 IP Group
 Ipsos MORI
 Isokon
 ITE Group
 ITV
 Iwoca

J

 J & A Beare
 J. and G. Rennie
 J&W Nicholson & Co
 Jardine Lloyd Thompson
 Jessica Kingsley Publishers
 Jestico + Whiles
 JKX Oil & Gas
 John Laing Group
 John Murray (publisher)
 John Penn and Sons
 Johnson Banks
 Johnson Matthey
 Justgiving

K

 Kantar TNS
 Kantar Worldpanel
 Kaplan Financial
 Kaupthing Singer & Friedlander
 Keith Prowse
 Keller Group
 Kennedys Law
 Kesslers International Group
 Keystone Law
 Kind Consumer
 Kingfisher
 Knight Frank
 Kold Sweat Records

L

 L.K.Bennett
 Ladbrokes
 Laird
 Lamson Engineering
 Language Connect
 Lasmo
 Last.fm
 LatinNews
 Lattice Group
 Law Debenture
 Leading Edge Forum
 Lebrecht Photo Library
 Legal & General
 Levitt Bernstein
 Lewis & Co
 Lewis Leathers
 Lewis Recordings
 Limmer Holdings
 Linklaters
 Lledo
 LLM Communications
 Lloyd Johnson
 Lloyds Banking Group
 London Capital Credit Union
 London Climate Change Agency
 The London Distillery Company
 London Necropolis Company
 London Stock Exchange Group
 LondonMetric Property
 Long Tall Sally Clothing
 Lonmin
 Loose Music
 Lucas Brothers
 Luther Pendragon

M

 Mace
 Macintyre Art Advisory
 Man Group
 Marex Spectron
 Marjan Television Network
 Markit
 Marks & Clerk
 Marks & Spencer
 Masabi
 Mathmos
 Maxwell Communications Corporation
 McBride
 Mecom Group
 Medical Research Council Technology
 Melrose Industries
 MEPC
 Mercury Asset Management
 Metaswitch
 Methuen Publishing
 Metropolis International
 MFI Group
 M&G
 MHP Communications
 Microplas
 Millennium & Copthorne Hotels
 Millhouse Capital
 Minerva
 Mintel
 Misys
 Mitie
 Mitre Sports International
 MJP Architects
 Moley Robotics
 Molton Brown
 Mondi Group
 Monex Europe
 Moneycorp
 Monington & Weston
 Morgan Crucible
 Morgan Sindall
 Morrison Facilities Services
 Moss Empires
 Mott MacDonald
 Mousebreaker
 Mushroom TV
 MWB Group Holdings
 My Family Care
 My Local Bobby
 MySociety

N

 Nails
 National Benzole
 National Express
 National Freight Corporation
 National Grid
 NatWest
 NBNK
 Nelsons
 New Moon
 News UK
 NEX Group
 Nimax Theatres
 Nobrow Press
 Norton Rose Fulbright
 Now Play It
 NTT Communications

O

 Oak Futures
 Ocean Group
 Odyssey Airlines
 OmniCompete
 Omnifone
 OnePoll
 OpenBet
 Ophir Energy
 Opinium Research
 Optimax
 Outsights
 Ovum
 Oxbridge Applications

P

 PA Consulting
 PACE Sports Management
 Palace Software
 Panmure Gordon & Co.
 Pantheon Ventures
 Park Royal Partnership
 Pearn, Pollinger & Higham
 Pearson
 Peek Freans
 Perenco
 Peruvian Corporation
 PH Media Group
 Phaidon Press
 Phillips & Drew
 Phoenix Group
 Pimlico Plumbers
 Pinchin Johnson & Associates
 Playfish
 Plus500
 Portland Communications
 Position Ignition
 Pottermore
 Premier Farnell
 Premier Oil
 Pressparty
 PricewaterhouseCoopers
 Progressive Digital Media
 Proxymity
 Prudential

Q
 QA
 Qiqqa
 Qube Software
 Quercus
 Quilter

R

 R. A. Rooney & Sons
 Railtrack
 Rapha
 Rara.com
 Rare Tea Company
 Rathbones
 Reaktion Books
 Reed
 Reed Elsevier
 Rentokil Initial
 Resolution
 The Restaurant Group
 Rexam
 Reynolds Porter Chamberlain
 Rigby & Peller
 Rio Tinto
 RjDj
 Roberson Wine
 Robert Fleming & Co
 Robert Walters
 Rockstar London
 Rolls-Royce Holdings
 Rothmans International
 Rothschild & Co
 Royal Dutch Shell
 Royal Exchange Assurance Corporation
 Royal London Asset Management
 Royal Mail
 RSA Insurance Group
 RSM International
 Rushes Postproduction
 RusPetro
 Russell & Bromley

S

 SG Warburg & Co
 Sainsbury's
 Salamander Energy
 Salviati
 Samuel Enderby & Sons
 Samvo Group
 Sanne Group
 Satellite Information Services
 Savills
 Scarlet Blade Theatre
 Schroders
 Science Photo Library
 Sears
 Secret Escapes
 Securicor
 Sedgwick Group
 See Tickets
 Select Model Management
 Sellar Property Group
 Sense Worldwide
 Seraphine
 Service in Informatics and Analysis
 Shaftesbury
 Sharps Pixley
 Shed Media
 Shutl
 Siebe Gorman
 Siebe
 Siemens Brothers
 Signet Jewelers
 Signwave
 Silence Therapeutics
 Silver Circle
 SilverDoor
 Simmons & Simmons
 Sinclair Research
 Sir Robert McAlpine
 Skinny Candy
 Slater & Gordon
 Slaughter & May
 Smith & Nephew
 Smiths Gore
 Smiths Group
 Sobranie
 SOCO International
 Sony Mobile Communications
 Spire Healthcare
 Splash Damage
 Sporting Index
 Spread Co
 Square Enix Europe
 SSL International
 Stainer & Bell
 Standard Chartered
 Standard Telephones and Cables
 Stanton Williams
 Stemcor
 SThree
 Storehouse
 Sun Life & Provincial Holdings
 Survation
 SVG Capital
 Swaine Adeney Brigg
 Swan Song Records
 Swire
 System Simulation

T

 Takeover/Cloud 9
 Takeover Entertainment
 TalkTalk Group
 Tanner Krolle
 Tata Steel Europe
 Tate & Lyle
 Tate Publishing
 Taxi Media
 Taylor Wimpey
 Taylor Woodrow
 TD Tom Davies
 TelecityGroup
 Telecom Plus
 Telewest
 TestPlant
 Thames
 Thames & Hudson
 Thames Water Authority
 Theodore Goddard
 THG Sports
 Thomas Cook & Son
 Thomsons Online Benefits
 Thorn Electrical Industries
 Thorn EMI
 Thurleigh Investment Managers
 Tilda
 Tinies
 Tomkins
 Touch Surgery
 Tower Hamlets Summer University
 TowerBrook Capital Partners
 TP ICAP
 Tradus
 Trafalgar House
 Transmeridian Air Cargo
 Transmission Recordings
 Travers Smith
 Trinity Mirror
 Trowers & Hamlins
 Trustee Savings Bank
 Tullett Prebon
 Tullow Oil
 TV Pixie

U

 Ubiquity Press
 UBM
 UCB Home Loans
 UCL Business
 Ugly Models
 UK Youth Parliament
 UKTV
 Ultramar
 Underbelly
 Unilever
 Union Hand-Roasted Coffee
 United Biscuits
 United Kingdom Accreditation Service

V

 Valaris
 Varsity Express
 Vedanta Resources
 Venturethree
 Versailles Group
 Vesuvius
 Viacom International Media Networks
 Viagogo
 Virgin EMI Records
 Virtual Internet
 VMware

W
 Web Technology Group
 Webb Ellis
 WebsEdge
 Whitehead Mann
 Whyte Chemicals
 Wildsmith Shoes
 William Hill
 William Watkins
 Williams Lea
 Willis Group
 The Woolwich
 Workspace Group
 World Television
 WPP

X

 Xchanging

Y

 Yeast Culture
 YossarianLives

Z

 Z/Yen

Newspapers published in London

 Al-Arab
 Bangla Mirror
 Barking & Dagenham Post
 Bell's Life in London
 Catholic Herald
 Christian Today
 The Guardian
 The Illustrated London News
 The Irish Post
 Lanka Tribune
 Lloyd's List
 The Muslim Weekly
 The Non-League Paper
 Romford Recorder
 South London Press
 The Tablet
 Town and Country Magazine
 The War Cry

See also

 List of pubs in London
 List of restaurants in London
 :Category:Defunct companies based in London
 :Category:Organisations based in London

References

 
London
London-related lists